Galba cubensis is a species of air-breathing freshwater snail, an aquatic gastropod mollusk in the family Lymnaeidae, the pond snails.

Distribution 
Galba cubensis is native to parts of South America, Mexico, the southern Coastal Plain of North America, and the West Indies, including Cuba.

References 

Lymnaeidae
Gastropods described in 1839